HIP 70849 is a star with two non-stellar companions in the southern constellation Lupus. It is a 10th magnitude star, making it too faint to be visible to the naked eye. The system is located at a distance of 78.7 light-years from the Sun based on parallax measurements.

This is a K-type main-sequence star with a stellar classification of K7Vk, where the 'k' indicates interstellar absorption features in the spectrum. The star is magnetically active with a  starspot cycle. It appears about 3.6 billion years old and the light emission shows a 41.2 day periodicity, which is likely the rotation period. This star, which resembles a brighter red dwarf, is smaller and less massive than the Sun. It is radiating just 9% of the luminosity of the Sun from its photosphere at an effective temperature of 4,103 K.

In 2009, a gas giant planet was found in orbit around it. There is also a T4.5 brown dwarf companion orbiting ~9000AU from HIP 70849.

See also
 List of extrasolar planets

References 

K-type main-sequence stars
Planetary systems with one confirmed planet
Lupus (constellation)
Durchmusterung objects
0550.3
070849